The 2013 Great Clips/Grit Chips 300 was the 24th stock car race of the 2013 NASCAR Nationwide Series and the 22nd iteration of the event. The race was held on Saturday, August 31, 2013, in Hampton, Georgia at Atlanta Motor Speedway, a 1.54 miles (2.48 km) permanent asphalt quad-oval intermediate speedway. The race took the scheduled 195 laps to complete. At race's end, Kevin Harvick, driving for Richard Childress Racing, would manage to hold off eventual second-place finisher, Joe Gibbs Racing driver Kyle Busch, to win his 40th career NASCAR Nationwide Series win and his first and only win of the season. To fill out the podium, Sam Hornish Jr. of Penske Racing would finish third.

Background 

Atlanta Motor Speedway (formerly Atlanta International Raceway) is a track in Hampton, Georgia, 20 miles (32 km) south of Atlanta. It is a 1.54-mile (2.48 km) quad-oval track with a seating capacity of 111,000. It opened in 1960 as a 1.5-mile (2.4 km) standard oval. In 1994, 46 condominiums were built over the northeastern side of the track. In 1997, to standardize the track with Speedway Motorsports' other two 1.5-mile (2.4 km) ovals, the entire track was almost completely rebuilt. The frontstretch and backstretch were swapped, and the configuration of the track was changed from oval to quad-oval. The project made the track one of the fastest on the NASCAR circuit.

Entry list 

 (R) denotes rookie driver.
 (i) denotes driver who is ineligible for series driver points.

*Withdrew.

Practice

First practice 
The first practice session was held on Friday, August 30, at 5:00 PM EST, and would last for an hour and 30 minutes.

Second and final practice 
The second and final practice session, sometimes referred to as Happy Hour, was held on Saturday, August 31, at 10:30 AM EST, and would last for one hour.

Qualifying 
Qualifying was held on Saturday, August 31, at 4:05 PM EST. Each driver would have two laps to set a fastest time; the fastest of the two would count as their official qualifying lap.

No drivers would fail to qualify.

Full qualifying results

Race results

Standings after the race 

Drivers' Championship standings

Note: Only the first 12 positions are included for the driver standings.

References 

2013 NASCAR Nationwide Series
NASCAR races at Atlanta Motor Speedway
August 2013 sports events in the United States
2013 in sports in Georgia (U.S. state)